Thomas Bateson, Batson or Betson (c.1570 – 16 March 1630) was an Anglo-Irish composer of madrigals and vocal church music in the early 17th century.

Life
Probably born in Cheshire, Bateson was organist of Chester Cathedral from 1599. He came to Dublin in April 1609 and served as organist and vicar choral at Christ Church Cathedral, Dublin from 1609 until his death.

In 1612 Bateson was the first Bachelor of Music at Trinity College, Dublin, a degree for which he submitted a seven-voice anthem entitled Holy, Lord God Almighty. He is known to have written more church music, but only this anthem has survived.

His fame mainly rests on madrigals, which give him an important place among late Elizabethan and Jacobean composers. He published two sets of madrigals in 1604 and 1618, and both collections have been reprinted in 1922 and again in 1958–60. He died in Dublin.

Bibliography
 Brian Boydell: "Thomas Bateson and the Earliest Degrees in Music Awarded by the University of Dublin", in: Hermathena vol. 146 (1989), pp. 53–60.
 William Henry Grindle: Irish Cathedral Music. A History of Music at the Cathedrals of the Church of Ireland (Belfast: Institute of Irish Studies, Queen's University of Belfast, 1989).
 Barra Boydell: Music at Christ Church Before 1800: Documents and Selected Anthems (Dublin: Four Courts Press, 1999).
 Barra Boydell: A History of Music at Christ Church Cathedral, Dublin (Woodbridge: The Boydell Press, 2004).

References

External links

 
 

1570s births
1630 deaths
16th-century English composers
17th-century English composers
17th-century male musicians
British male organists
Christ Church Cathedral, Dublin
Classical composers of church music
English male composers
English organists
Irish classical composers
Irish organists
Musicians from Cheshire